Astathes fulgida is a species of beetle in the family Cerambycidae. It was described by Johan Christian Fabricius in 1801. It is known from Sumatra.

References

F
Beetles described in 1801